Mangelia attenuata is a species of sea snail, a marine gastropod mollusk in the family Mangeliidae.

Description
The shell size varies between 5 mm and 13 mm.

The shell has nine whorls. Each whorl contains nine ribs, narrow, flexuous, with wider interspaces, spirally slightly and finely striate. The narrow aperture is long. The siphonal canal is short and broad.  Its color is pale tawny, the upper part and middle of the body whorl often banded, or the lower half of the body whorl darker colored, sometimes there are several narrow revolving chestnut lines.

Distribution
This species occurs in the Northeast Atlantic Ocean, in European waters (but not in the southern part of the North Sea) and in the Mediterranean Sea.

References

 Montagu. Test. Brit., p. 266, pl. 9, f. 6, 1803, 30
 Arnaud, P.M. (1978) Revision des taxa malacologiques meditérranéens introduit par Antoine Risso. Annales du Muséum d’Histoire Naturelle de Nice, 5, 101–150. 
 Hayward, P.J.; Ryland, J.S. (Ed.) (1990). The marine fauna of the British Isles and North-West Europe: 1. Introduction and protozoans to arthropods. Clarendon Press: Oxford, UK. . 627 pp
 Gofas, S.; Le Renard, J.; Bouchet, P. (2001). Mollusca, in: Costello, M.J. et al. (Ed.) (2001). European register of marine species: a check-list of the marine species in Europe and a bibliography of guides to their identification. Collection Patrimoines Naturels, 50: pp. 180–213

External links
 
  Tucker, J.K. 2004 Catalog of recent and fossil turrids (Mollusca: Gastropoda). Zootaxa 682:1–1295.

attenuata
Gastropods described in 1803
Molluscs of the Mediterranean Sea